Paulinus or Paullinus may refer to:

Christian saints
Paulinus of Antioch
Paulinus of Nola, poet and bishop
Paulinus of York, first bishop of York
Paulinus II of Aquileia, Italian bishop, poet and scholar
Paulinus of Wales
Paulinus of Trier, 4th-century bishop

Other people
Paulinus (consul 498)
Paulinus (follower of Plotinus)
Paulinus II of Antioch
Paulinus, bishop of the Eustathian party at Antioch
Paulinus the Deacon, 5th-century biographer of Ambrose
Paulinus of Venice (died 1344), Franciscan historian

People with the name
Gaius Suetonius Paulinus, general who defeated Boudica
Sextus Anicius Paulinus, consul in 325
Amnius Anicius Paulinus, consul in 334
Decius Paulinus, consul of the Western Roman Empire in 534
Paul Aurelian or Paulinus Aurelianus

Fictional
Paulinus Maximus, main character of Eagle in the Snow
Aulus Paulinus, Roman Governor of Britain in Chelmsford 123
Paulinus "Paul" Taylor, character in The Blob